The Battle of Migdol (601 BC) took place near the eastern border of Egypt between the Babylonians led by Nebuchadnezzar II and the Egyptians led by Necho II.

Background 
In the late years of the 7th century BC, the Neo-Babylonians had expanded into Syria-Palestine after driving the Egyptians out of the region. Yet, there was still Egyptian influence in the Southern Levant area close to Egypt. Therefore, a Babylonian campaign against Egypt itself was needed to end Egyptian intervention and strengthen Babylonian control in the Southern Levant and to invade Egypt itself.

Battle 
The battle took place in the last days of 601 BC. Nebuchadnezzar advanced into the sinai to invade Egypt and was met by Necho and his forces. a fierce battle broke out near the fortress of Migdol where both sides had many casualties. the Babylonians withdrew and were pursued by Necho who captured Gaza. Nebuchadnezzar stayed home the next year to rebuild his forces.

References

Late Period of ancient Egypt
Neo-Babylonian Empire
7th-century BC conflicts
Battles involving Babylonia
Battles involving ancient Egypt